Neil Sedaka's Greatest Hits may refer to:

 Neil Sedaka's Greatest Hits (1977 album)
 Neil Sedaka's Greatest Hits (RCA International album), 1980

See also
 Neil Sedaka Sings His Greatest Hits
 Neil Sedaka: All Time Greatest Hits, Volume 2